Sound of White Noise is the sixth studio album by American heavy metal band Anthrax, released in May 1993 via Elektra Records. It is the band's first album to feature vocalist John Bush, who replaced longtime Anthrax vocalist Joey Belladonna in 1992. It is also Anthrax's last studio album with longtime lead guitarist Dan Spitz. This was also the second album Bush worked on with producer Dave Jerden, as he also produced Symbol of Salvation for Bush's previous band, Armored Saint.

Overview
The album, produced by the band and Dave Jerden, includes the singles "Only", "Room for One More", "Black Lodge" and "Hy Pro Glo". This album marked a significant revision in the band's sound, with the departure of lead vocalist Joey Belladonna and the introduction of grunge influences. Jerden was known for producing the likes of Alice in Chains and Jane's Addiction.

With Sound of White Noise, Anthrax moved away from the rapid-fire thrash metal that had defined their earlier output. Their new sound drew on the more straightforward style of Armored Saint (Bush co-wrote all the songs) and often emphasized more melodic songwriting. White Noise continued the trend started on 1990's Persistence of Time of abandoning the humor of Anthrax's 1980s albums in favor of a more serious or earnest tone. Songs like the walloping "Only" and stuttering, stop-start dynamics of "Hy Pro Glo" maintained a level of aggression on par with anything else the band recorded, but in a different alternative metal style. Other songs found Anthrax exploring new territory, like the mid-tempo "Room for One More", and the atmospheric "Black Lodge" (inspired by the Twin Peaks TV series and featuring keyboardist Angelo Badalamenti). Bush's lower-pitched, darker vocal style also was a drastic change from Belladona's. During the recording of the album, the band also produced the songs "Poison My Eyes" and a cover of the Smiths song "London" (both would be featured on the soundtracks to the movies Last Action Hero and Airheads, respectively).

Reception

Dave Connolly reviewed the album on behalf of AllMusic and called it "surprisingly melodic" but "predictably pummeling" and the music "relentless". He commends the overall quality of the songs on the album before settling on "Only" as the best overall, but calls out several other tracks for praise as well. Canadian journalist Martin Popoff praised the performance of new singer John Bush and the production by Dave Jerden and defined the album's music "top-flight, state-of-the-art metal, fortified by the band's usual societal concerns, here elevated to eloquent outrage at man's crumbling morality." Spin critic John Wiederhorn described the album as "a good typical heavy-metal record." Nevertheless, he also noted that the album "doesn't wander beyond the sound of its dark, moody intros and tuneful, galloping rhythms." Tom Sinclair of Rolling Stone described the album as "a powerful comeback from a group that never went away."

Among the album's songs, "Only" has received particular attention; Metallica frontman James Hetfield is said to have referred to "Only" as a "perfect song".

Commercial performance 
The album debuted at No. 7 on the Billboard 200 charts, selling 62,000 copies in its first week. It is Anthrax's highest ever chart position. It sold 40,000 more copies in its second week. Sound of White Noise was certified gold by the RIAA on July 13, 1993. 

As of 2002, the album had sold 511,284 copies in the US.

The singles "Only" and "Black Lodge" charted at No. 26 and No. 38 respectively on the Billboard Hot Mainstream Rock Tracks chart. In the UK, "Only" and "Black Lodge" charted at No. 36 and No. 53 respectively.

Track listings

Personnel
Album personnel adapted from album credits.

Charts

Certifications

References

External links

Anthrax (American band) albums
1993 albums
Albums produced by Dave Jerden
Elektra Records albums